The Laguna Mountains are a mountain range of the Peninsular Ranges System in eastern San Diego County, southern California.

The mountains have long been inhabited by the indigenous Kumeyaay people.

Geography
The Laguna Mountains are bordered by the Cuyamaca Mountains area on the west and the Colorado Desert on the east, where the mountains form a steep escarpment along the Laguna Salada Fault. To the north the Laguna Mountains are bounded by the Elsinore Fault Zone and to the south by Cameron Valley and Thing Valley.

The mountains are largely contained within the Cleveland National Forest. Snow falls on the highest peaks several times a year. Mount Laguna is a village in the Laguna Mountains with a population of about 80.

The headwaters of three perennial streams begin in the Laguna Mountains: Noble Creek, Cottonwood Creek, and Kitchen Creek.

The Sawtooth Range and In-Ko-Pah Mountains are adjacent to the east. The Santa Rosa Mountains lie further to the northeast. The Cuyamaca Mountains are adjacent along the west.

The southern section is in the Mountain Empire region of San Diego County, and the northern section is in the East County region.

Recreation
The Laguna Mountains are a popular recreation area in the Cleveland National Forest. They comprise the southernmost crest along the Pacific Crest Trail.

Their relatively high altitude induces the highest snowfall in San Diego County making it one of the few local places to offer snow activities like sledding and snowshoeing.

See also

References

External links

 
Peninsular Ranges
Mountain ranges of San Diego County, California
Cleveland National Forest
Escarpments of the United States
East County (San Diego County)
Mountain Empire (San Diego County)
Kumeyaay
Mountain ranges of the Colorado Desert
Mountain ranges of Southern California